Manah is a town in the region of Ad Dakhiliyah, in northeastern Oman. As of 2010 it had a population of 7,749.

Background

The wilayat of Manah is thought to be the first resting place of Malik bin Fahim al Azdi before the Arabs entered Oman when the Marib Dam in what is today Yemen broke. A falaj in Manah still bears his name. In the old town, there are many caves which were said to be hiding places during the war for women and children. There is also a subterranean vault located in one of the ancient houses in Al Fiqin.

Legend surrounds the Az al Qadim mosque located within the town: it is said that a 100 kg rock was moved by a visitor to the mosque, which he took with him on his travels south. The next day, upon waking, the man noticed the rock had disappeared, only to be found back in the mosque. The rock still lies in the mosque and has the imprint of a man's foot on it. Sultan Qaboos' royal camp for inspection of the region of Ad Dakhliyah lies at Seih al Barakat in Manah, as does the Hisn Al Shomoukh palace.

Place for learning Arabic
Manah is the place where Sultan Qaboos College for Teaching Arabic Language to Non-Native Speakers is located. The college strives to become a regional and international leader in ASL  teaching, through its high quality programs that depends on the latest technologies in teaching foreign languages and contribution in building communication and cultural bridges with other non-Arabic speaking nations.

The mission of Sultan Qaboos College for Teaching Arabic Language to Non-Native Speakers is to contribute to the production of graduates with high linguistic and cultural competency in Modern Standard Arabic. The college strives to enable the students to communicate and interact effectively in any Arab society and to allow them to continue further studies in educational institutions where Arabic is the medium of instruction.

See also
 List of cities in Oman

References

Populated places in Oman
Ad Dakhiliyah Governorate